Whiskey Row may refer to:

 Whiskey Row, Louisville, street that once served as home to the bourbon industry in Louisville, Kentucky
 Whiskey Row, Prescott, a block in Prescott, Arizona once home to more than 40 saloons during the early 20th century